Dabda or Dabra is a village in Didwana tehsil of Nagaur district in Rajasthan.

References

Further reading
 The Census Report of Marwar (Jodhpur State) – 1941, published by Government of Jodhpur
V.P.Menon, Integration of the Indian States, Orient Longman, New Delhi
Ram Kishan Kalla, Dabra Ki Kahani, Usi Ki Jabani (Hindi), Rajasthan National Congress

External links
 Mathura Das Mathur

Villages in Nagaur district